Raise Your Head is a 2009 Italian drama film written and directed by Alessandro Angelini.

For her performance Anita Kravos was nominated for David di Donatello for best supporting actress, and the film also received two nominations a Nastri d'Argento Awards,  for best original story and for best actor (Sergio Castellitto).

Cast  
  Sergio Castellitto  as  Mero
  Gabriele Campanelli  as  Lorenzo 
 Giorgio Colangeli as   Malagodi
 Anita Kravos  as  Sonia
  Duccio Camerini  as  Abatino
  Augusto Fornari   as  Brancifiore
  Gabriel Spahiu  as  Radu

See also   
 List of Italian films of 2009

References

External links

2009 films
2000s coming-of-age drama films
2009 drama films
2000s sports drama films
Italian boxing films
Italian coming-of-age drama films
Italian sports drama films
2000s Italian films